The Ven. (John) Trevor McCabe was Archdeacon of Cornwall from 1996 to 1999.

McCabe was educated at Falmouth Grammar School; the University of Nottingham; St Catherine's College, Oxford; and Wycliffe Hall, Oxford. He was ordained in 1959. After curacies in Compton Gifford and Exeter he held incumbencies in Capel, Surrey and the Scilly Isles. He was also a Chaplain in the RNR from 1963 to 1983 and a Canon Residentiary at Bristol Cathedral from 1981 to 1983. After that he was at Manaccan with Helston until his appointment as Archdeacon.

References

1933 births
Living people
Alumni of Ely Theological College
Alumni of St Catherine's College, Oxford
Archdeacons of Bodmin
People from Cornwall
People educated at Falmouth Grammar School
Alumni of Wycliffe Hall, Oxford
Alumni of the University of Nottingham